Duridan (also Romanized as Dūrīdān and Dūrydān; also known as Darīdān, Dorīdān, and Duzi Dūn) is a village in Hastijan Rural District, in the Central District of Delijan County, Markazi Province, Iran. At the 2006 census, its population was 52, in 21 families.

References 

Populated places in Delijan County